Misko Iho (born Mikko Iho; May 9, 1975, in Helsinki) is a Finnish film director.

In the mid 1990s, he was part of the computer demo group, Future Crew, and later worked designing computer game graphics in the United States. He also worked in organizing a number of music events, and later as a commercial and music video director - winning a number of Finnish and international awards.

Life and work
Misko Iho was born on May 9, 1975, as Mikko Iho in Helsinki, Finland. From 1992 to 1994, Misko was a part of a now-defunct computer demo group, Future Crew, as the graphic artist named "Pixel". Noteworthy demos by Future Crew include Unreal (released at Assembly 1992), Panic (released at The Party 1992), and Second Reality (released at Assembly 1993). Slashdot voted the Future Crew Demo Second Reality as one of the "Top 10 Hacks of All Time".

During 1994, Misko spent a few months in the United States designing computer game graphics for the game Epic Pinball by Epic MegaGames as well as Ken's Labyrinth.

From 1997 to 2001, he worked as a visual effects artist creating visual effects for commercials, feature films, and music videos for bands like Bomfunk MC's, JS16 and Darude (Sandstrom, Feel The Beat, Out Of Control). Darude's Sandstorm was the best selling 12" worldwide in 2000.

Misko was also busy from 1997 to 2004 running a club concept in Finland called "Screen". During those years, he was involved in organizing over a hundred club events and bringing some of the most-influential  club deejays in the world to Finland. Screen guests included deejays like John Digweed, Carl Cox, Deep Dish, Josh Wink, Dave Seaman, Nick Warren, Sander Kleinenberg, Danny Rampling, Steve Lawler, Sister Bliss, and many others.

Since 2002 he has worked as a commercial and music video director in Finland and abroad. His most-known works include the commercial film series for the Finnish Railways and awards winning music videos for the Finnish singer Chisu and Sunrise Avenue.

2010 his music video for the Finnish singer Chisu was chosen as the Music Video of the Year in Finland at the annual Muuvi Awards organized by IFPI (International Federation of the Phonographic Industry). The video also won the Audience Award.
2012 his next video for Chisu was again chosen as the  Music Video of the Year in Finland at the annual Finnish Grammy Awards Emma-Awards.

2010 his debut short film Potilas (The Patient) was awarded of "Best Direction" at the Super Shorts International Film Festival in London and 2011 as the "Best short film" at the Byron Bay Film Festival in Australia.

Selected filmography

Short films

The Patient (2010) 

Best Direction
Super Shorts International Film Festival - UK 2010
Best Short Film
Byron Bay International Film Festival - Australia 2011
Best International Actor - Jani Volanen
Cinefiesta - Puerto Rico 2011

Official Selections
 International Sci-Fi & Fantasy Film Festival of Athens - Greece 2012
 Vimeo - Staff Pick 2011
 Cinefiesta - Puerto Rico 2011
 Festival Mas Sorrer - Spain 2011
 Boston LGBT Film Festival - USA 2011
 Manlleu Short Film Festival - Spain 2011
 Riverside International Film Festival - USA 2011
 European Short Film Festival at MIT - USA 2011
 Palm Beach International Film Festival - USA 2011
 Byron Bay International Film Festival - Australia 2011
 Tampere Film Festival - Finland 2011
 The Magnolia Independent Film Festival - USA 2011
 FEC Gambrils-Reues XIII European Short Film Festival - Spain 2011
 Super Shorts International Film Festival - UK 2010
 Hollywood Reel Independent Film Festival - USA 2010
 The Stepping Stone Film Festival - India 2010
 Lone Star International Film Festival - USA 2010
 Helsinki International Film Festival - Finland 2010

Music videos

2013
 Sydänlupaus by J. Karjalainen

2012
 Eva by Jippu

2011
 Kohtalon oma by Chisu
 Sabotage by Chisu
 I don't dance by Sunrise Avenue
 Kokeile Minua - Haloo Helsinki!

2010
 Pimeä onni - Jippu & Samuli Edelmann
 Linnunrata - CMX
 Kunnon Syy - Irina & Maija Vilkkumaa
 Nettiin by Jenni Vartiainen
 Killing Me by Cristal Snow
 I Wanna Be A Rockstar by Waldo's People

2009
 Adwoa Fowaah by Bredren B (Ghana)
 Life by Bredren B (Ghana)
 Welcome To My Life by Sunrise Avenue
 Baden-Baden by Chisu
 Padayu (Falling) by Khaki (Russia)

2008
  Lose Control by Waldo's People (Eurovision 2009 Finland)
 Silent Despair by Anna Abreu
 Annie And I by Kristiina Wheeler
 Luokkakokous by Maija Vilkkumaa
 Suojatiellä by Maija Vilkkumaa
 China Cool by Cristal Snow
 Sunny Day by Kristiina Wheeler
 Muut by Chisu
 Can't Save Me by Cristal Snow

2007
 Scarred by Cristal Snow
 Pump It Up by Cristal Snow

2003
 I Feel Love by Dallas Superstars

Sports career

Skydiving (2004 –present).

Awards
 Gold - Freeflying at Finnish National Skydiving Championships 2009
 Silver - Freeflying at Finnish National Skydiving Championships 2008
 Silver - Freeflying at Finnish National Skydiving Championships 2007

Records
 Florida state vertical record 42-way (2011)
 European vertical record 80-way (2011) 
 Nordic vertical record 39-way (2011)
 Finnish national vertical record 20-way (2011) 
 Finnish national vertical record 14-way (2010)

References

External links
miskoiho.com Official homepage

The Patient The Patient at IMDb
screenclub.net Screen club homepage

1975 births
Living people
Advertising directors
Demosceners
Finnish film directors
Finnish music video directors
Finnish skydivers